Tingena maranta is a species of moth in the family Oecophoridae. It is endemic to New Zealand and is found in the lower South Island. Adults of this species are on the wing from October until January. This species perfers grass or low herb habitat. Unlike its close relatives it does not inhabit native forest.

Taxonomy 

This species was originally described by Edward Meyrick in 1886 using a specimen collected by Alfred Philpott in December at Invercargill and named Oecophora maranta. In 1915 Meyrick discussed this species under the name Borkhausenia maranta. In 1926 Alfred Philpott discussed and illustrated the genitalia of the male of this species. In 1928 George Hudson also discussed and illustrated this species in his book The butterflies and moths of New Zealand. In 1988 J. S. Dugdale placed this species within the genus Tingena. The male holotype is held at the Natural History Museum, London.

Description 
Meyrick described this species as follows:
This species is pale in colouration and has distinctively narrow forewings.

Distribution
This species is endemic to New Zealand and has been observed in Invercargill, as well as at Dunedin, Mount Ida, Central Otago and Mount Earnslaw / Pikirakatahi.

Behaviour 
Adults are on the wing from October until January.

Habitat 
This species prefers to inhabit areas with grass or low herbs, and does not inhabit native forest.

References

Oecophoridae
Moths of New Zealand
Moths described in 1886
Endemic fauna of New Zealand
Taxa named by Edward Meyrick
Endemic moths of New Zealand